This page is a discography for the singer and songwriter Harry Chapin. Chapin was a popular singer in the 1970s and 1980s. He achieved international success with a string of hits throughout the 70s and 80s. Chapin's career was cut short at its peak, when he was killed in a car accident in 1981. Shortly after his career debut in 1972, he became one of the highest paid artists in the world. All of his single releases managed to chart on at least one international chart.

TV appearances and credits
Harry Chapin was featured on many TV shows throughout his career. Most notably on The Tonight Show Starring Johnny Carson. He was on the show a total of 14 times. He made history as the first performer to be called back the next night to perform on the show. This was due to performance of Taxi.

He became friends with fellow songwriter, John Denver, often appearing on TV with him. Denver hosted the pilot episode of The Midnight Special in which Harry was one of the first performers on the show.

−	
The following are all the currently known TV shows and movies Harry Chapin was on or has songwriting credits on:
	
15th Annual Grammy Awards	
17th Annual Grammy Awards	
20 to One	
American Bandstand	
Behind the Music	
Blue Water White Death	
Book of Chapin	
Cutting Loose	
Cotton Patch Gospel	
Cougar Town	
De Mike Burstyn Show	
Dick Cavett Show	
Dinah!	
Don Kirshner's Rock Concert	
Duel in the Wind: In Defense of America's Cup	
Friday Night, Saturday Morning	
Friday Night With Steve Edwards
Get a Life
Gilmore Girls: A Year in the Life	
It's Always Sunny in Philadelphia	
Goodnight America	
Grand Theft Auto V	
Happy Endings	
Harry Chapin: The Final Concert
Harry Chapin Tribute	
How I Met Your Mother	
Last Vegas	
Legendary Champions	
Let's Sing Out	
Make a Wish	
Merv Griffin Show	
Mike Douglas Show	
Modern Family
Mother and Daughter: The Loving War	
Mr. Jealousy	
My Music	
Mystery Science Theater 3000	
Remember When: The Anthology	
Robot Chicken	
Rock Music Awards	
Rockpalast	
Rude(ish) Tube	
Saturday Night Live
Scrubs	
Shrek the Third	
Solid Gold	
Soundstage	
That '70s Show	
The Circle (1972)	
The David Frost Show	
The Ernie Sigley Show	
The Goldbergs
The Jim Nabors Show	
The Midnight Special	
The N.S.V.I.P.'s	
The Office	
The Simpsons
There's a Lotta Lonely People Tonight	
'Til Death	
Welcome to the Basement	
Wonderama

Albums

Studio albums

Live albums

Compilation and specialty albums

Other appearances
 Chapin Music! (1966, Rock-Land Records) – by The Chapin Brothers (Harry, Tom and Steve along with their father Jim)

Singles
Sales figures with a * are estimated based on album sales.

Notes

Videos
An Evening With... Harry Chapin (1998)
Rockpalast Live (2002)
Remember When: The Anthology (2005)
You Are the Only Song (2006)

References

External links

Discographies of American artists
Folk music discographies